{{DISPLAYTITLE:C16H26N2O3}}
The molecular formula C16H26N2O3 (molar mass: 294.389 g/mol, exact mass: 294.1943 u) may refer to:

 Propoxycaine
 Proxymetacaine

Molecular formulas